Bramer is a surname. Notable people with the surname include:

Benjamin Bramer (1588–1652), German mathematician, architect, inventor, and adviser
Leonaert Bramer, Dutch artist
Shannon Bramer (b. 1973), Canadian poet

See also
Jimmy Van Bramer (b. 1969), American politician